The Cameroonian shrew (Crocidura picea) is a species of mammal in the family Soricidae. It is endemic to Cameroon. Its natural habitat is subtropical or tropical moist montane forests. It is threatened by habitat loss.

References

Crocidura
Mammals of Cameroon
Endemic fauna of Cameroon
Mammals described in 1940
Taxonomy articles created by Polbot